
The Petavatthu is a Theravada Buddhist scripture, included in the Minor Collection (Khuddaka Nikaya) of the Pali Canon's Sutta Pitaka. It ostensibly reports stories about and conversations among the Buddha and his disciples, and it dates to about 300BC at the earliest. It is composed of 51 verse narratives describing specifically how the effects of bad acts can lead to rebirth into the unhappy world of petas (ghosts) in the doctrine of kamma. More importantly, it details how meritorious actions by the living can benefit such suffering beings.

The scripture also includes stories of Maha Moggallāna's travels to the hungry ghost realm and his discussions with hungry ghosts and his understanding of the realm. It also includes a story of how Sariputta rescued his mother from hell by making offerings to the monks as a form of merit-making to increase the chance of a hungry ghost being reborn as a higher being.

The scripture gave prominence to the doctrine that giving alms to monks may benefit the ghosts of one's relatives seen in the Hungry Ghost Festival and ceremonies conducted in Cambodia, Sri Lanka, Thailand, and Laos. While regarded by scholars as a later text with relatively little doctrinal content or literary merit, the Petavatthu and a similar text, the Vimānavatthu, became popular sources for sermons due to the narratives on the effects of kamma contained in their commentaries.

Legacy 

The Sariputta story of the Petavatthu was adapted in 6th-century China to form the Mahayana Yulanpen Sutra, which makes Mulian (i.e., Maudgalyayana) its hero. Similar to its effect in South and Southeast Asia, the dissemination of the story led to the spread of a Ghost Festival throughout the Sinosphere.

A version of the Petavatthu's Maudgalyayana story separately became a Chinese legend or folk tale known as "Mulian Rescues His Mother".

Editions 
 "Stories of the departed", tr Henry S. Gehman, in Minor Anthologies of the Pali Canon, volume IV, 1942, Pali Text Society, Bristol
 In Peta-Stories, tr U Ba Kyaw & Peter Masefield, 1980, Pali Text Society, Bristol; translation of the commentary, with the verses embedded; the PTS's preferred translation

See also 
 Khuddaka Nikāya
 Dhammapada
 Itivuttaka
 Sutta Nipata
 Theragatha
 Therigatha
 Udana
 Vimanavatthu

References

Citations

Bibliography 
 .
 .
 .

External links 
Dedication of Merits to our Departed Next-of-Kin
Petavatthu – List of Stories
Religious Giving and the Invention of Karma in Theravada Buddhism By James R. Egge
Complete English translation by Ven. Gnanananda Thero

Khuddaka Nikaya